The Midland Community School District is a rural public school district headquartered in Wyoming, Iowa. It operates an elementary school in Oxford Junction and a middle-high (secondary) school and a learning center in Wyoming.

The district is located in sections of Jones, Jackson, Clinton and a small area in Cedar counties. It serves Wyoming, Oxford Junction, Lost Nation, Monmouth, and Onslow. Additionally, the district shares the town of Olin with the Anamosa Community School District.

History
The district was founded in 1962 when the Wyoming, Onslow, Monmouth, Canton and Center Junction school districts consolidated. The district is named after a railroad that ran through the area.

The Lost Nation school district merged into the Midland district on July 1, 1993, and the Oxford Junction district merged with it on July 1, 1995.

In 2009 the district had about 510 students, with enrollment decreasing. Nathan Marting served as superintendent and secondary school principal for Midland until 2009, when he left to become the superintendent of the Jesup Community School District.

In 2019, the Olin Consolidated Community School District began to grade share its 6th-12th grades with Midland; students from the district can go to either Midland or Anamosa.

Schools
The district operates two schools:
 Midland Elementary School
 Midland Middle/High School

Midland High School

Athletics
The Eagles participate in the Tri-Rivers Conference in the following sports:
Football
Cross Country
Volleyball
Basketball
Wrestling
Golf
Track and Field
Baseball
Softball

See also
List of school districts in Iowa
List of high schools in Iowa

References

External links
 Midland Community School District
 Midland Community School District Budget Appeal FY2011, Issued June 1, 2010

School districts in Iowa
1962 establishments in Iowa
Education in Cedar County, Iowa
Education in Jackson County, Iowa
Education in Jones County, Iowa
Education in Clinton County, Iowa
School districts established in 1962